Pacific Racing (later known as Pacific Grand Prix, and finally as Pacific Team Lotus) was a motor racing team from the United Kingdom.

Origins and success in lower formulae

The team was founded by former mechanic Keith Wiggins in 1984, to race in the European Formula Ford Championship, with Norwegian driver Harald Huysman and Marlboro backing. Huysman won both the European and Benelux titles. On Huysman's advice, Pacific entered Bertrand Gachot in British Formula Ford with a Reynard in 1985. The following year, Gachot, also part of the Marlboro World Championship team, won the Formula Ford 2000 crown for Pacific. Marlboro stayed with Wiggins' team in FF2000 in 1987, winning the British title with JJ Lehto.

In 1988, Pacific entered the British F3 Championship with Lehto and a Reynard car, and won the title on their first attempt. Wiggins did not want to stay in F3 and moved up to Formula 3000, once more in association with Reynard and Marlboro. However, Lehto and Eddie Irvine's season was disappointing and the tobacco company's support moved to rival DAMS in 1990. The team returned to form in 1991, taking Christian Fittipaldi to the F3000 crown.

Formula One

Pacific Racing had won in every junior category it had participated in, and by 1992 Wiggins was determined that it would make the step up to F1 for the 1993 season, in the process renaming the team as Pacific Grand Prix. Lacking an in-house engineering staff and conscious of how limited his timescale was, Wiggins contacted F3000 constructor Reynard Racing to design and build the new PR01 chassis, hoping to benefit from several years of research and development that Reynard had invested in their recently scrapped in-house F1 project. Unfortunately for Pacific, the Rory Byrne-led design team had gone to Benetton at the end of 1991 and Reynard had sold the design (still in form of paper drawings) to Ligier. The small PR01 design team, working at Reynard but nominally employed by Pacific to conform to FIA Regulations, were forced to start a new design based on what little of the Reynard F1 research remained and utilizing a number of minor components from Reynard's F3000 chassis in an attempt to constrain costs. With their roots in the same project, the resulting Benetton B193, Ligier JS37 and Pacific PR01 shared the same slab-sided, raised-nose profile that later became standard in Formula One.

They instead postponed their entry in January 1993 because of a recession and resulting failure of investors to pay up.

They were unable to enter F1 until 1994. The year was a disaster. Paul Belmondo and former Jordan driver Bertrand Gachot (who was a shareholder in the team) started the season as drivers, with Oliver Gavin testing. The PR01, designed for the 1993 season, had undergone none of the vital wind tunnel testing required to refine the car's aerodynamics, had seen only a few dozen miles of track testing and its Ilmor 3.5 L V10 engine was underpowered by 1994 standards. That season the team failed to score a point or finish a single race, and from the French Grand Prix onwards, neither car qualified.

Aiming for a fresh start in 1995, Pacific made a deal with the owner of the former Team Lotus to enter as "Pacific Team Lotus".  Although no staff, equipment or technology came to the team as a result, the aim was for Pacific to benefit from association with the famous Lotus name. The obsolete Ilmor engines had been replaced by Ford ED V8s and a whole host of new sponsors were brought in. Good news also came when the PR02 was guaranteed a start each race, with Larrousse and Lotus disappearing from the entry lists and only Forti coming in. An embarrassing moment happened during the reveal of the car when it took Wiggins 25 minutes to open a bottle of champagne. Belmondo had been replaced with Andrea Montermini. Having had no luck in the first half of the season, team partner Gachot vacated his seat in mid-1995, making way for paydrivers Giovanni Lavaggi (four races, four DNFs) and Jean-Denis Délétraz (two races, one DNF, one NC). Gachot later returned after the money of the two pay-drivers dried up and two drivers Wiggins wanted to run (Formula Nippon driver Katsumi Yamamoto for Okayama and Suzuka and test driver Oliver Gavin for Australia) were denied superlicences. Pacific's best finishes that season were 8th in the German and Australian Grands Prix.

Withdrawal and aftermath
At the end of the 1995 season, the team withdrew from Formula One and Wiggins went back to Formula 3000, resurrecting Pacific Racing with Patrick Lemarié and Cristiano da Matta as drivers, but was unable to recapture the success of the pre-F1 era. Both were replaced by Oliver Tichy and Marc Gené for the following season; Gené left the team after his accident at Pau, and Tichy continued alone until the team quit mid-season. In 1997 Wiggins also attempted to enter sportscar racing and the 24 Hours of Le Mans with a heavily modified BRM chassis known as the P301 and using Nissan engines. Following a series of failures for the project into 1998, Wiggins closed the team.

Wiggins joined Lola and helped the constructor reclaim ground in the Champ Car World Series. With a foothold in the United States, the mechanic-turned-team manager joined up with the Herdez brewery and in 2000 acquired Bettenhausen Motorsports, renaming it HVM Racing. In 2006, Paul Stoddart, former owner of the Minardi F1 team, bought an interest in the team and renamed it Minardi Team USA; the team reverted to the HVM Racing name after American open-wheel reunification two years later, before leaving the sport at the end of 2012 season.

Racing record

Results summary

* Including points scored for other teams.

Complete International Formula 3000 results

(key)

Complete Formula One results
(key)

References

External links

Team Profile on F1 Rejects

Formula One constructors
Formula One entrants
British auto racing teams
British racecar constructors
International Formula 3000 teams
24 Hours of Le Mans teams
FIA Sportscar Championship entrants
1984 establishments in the United Kingdom
1998 disestablishments in the United Kingdom
British Formula Three teams
Auto racing teams established in 1984